Fabbrico (Reggiano:  or ; locally ) is a comune (municipality) in the Province of Reggio Emilia in the Italian region Emilia-Romagna, located about  northwest of Bologna and about  northeast of Reggio Emilia.

Fabbrico borders the following municipalities: Campagnola Emilia, Carpi, Reggiolo, Rio Saliceto, Rolo.

References

Cities and towns in Emilia-Romagna